How to Read Donald Duck is a 1971 book-length essay by Ariel Dorfman and Armand Mattelart that critiques Disney comics from a Marxist point of view as capitalist propaganda for American corporate and cultural imperialism. It was first published in Chile in 1971, became a bestseller throughout Latin America and is still considered a seminal work in cultural studies. It was reissued in August 2018 to a general audience in the United States, with a new introduction by Dorfman, by OR Books.

Summary 
The book's thesis is that Disney comics are not only a reflection of the prevailing ideology at the time (capitalism), but that they are also aware of this, and are active agents in spreading the ideology. To do so, Disney comics use images of the everyday world:

This closeness to everyday life is so only in appearance, because the world shown in the comics, according to the thesis, is based on ideological concepts, resulting in a set of natural rules that lead to the acceptance of particular ideas about capital, the developed countries' relationship with the Third World, gender roles, etc.

As an example, the book considers the lack of descendants of the characters.<ref>[https://books.google.com/books?id=88FZhF-3P9kC Dorfman A., Mattelart A. Para leer al pato Donald] p. 23. 1983. Besides the lack of descendants, there is a complete lack of libido or sexuality. The quote at the beginning of this chapter is remarkable:
"Daisy: If you teach me how to skate this afternoon I'll give you what you have always wanted. 
Donald: Do you mean...?Daisy: Yes... my 1872 coin"</ref> Everybody has an uncle or nephew, everybody is a cousin of someone, but nobody has fathers or sons. This non-parental reality creates horizontal levels in society, where there is no hierarchic order, except the one given by the amount of money and wealth possessed by each, and where there is almost no solidarity among those of the same level, creating a situation where the only thing left is crude competition. Another issue analyzed is the absolute necessity to have a stroke of luck for social mobility (regardless of the effort or intelligence involved), the lack of ability of the native tribes to manage their wealth, and others.

 Publication history How to Read Donald Duck was written and published during the brief flowering of democratic socialism under the government of Salvador Allende and his Popular Unity coalition and is closely identified with the revolutionary politics of its era. In 1973, a coup d'état, secretly supported by the United States, brought in power the military dictatorship of Augusto Pinochet. During Pinochet's regime, How to Read Donald Duck was banned and subject to book burning; its authors were forced into exile.

Outside Chile, How to Read Donald Duck became the most widely printed political text in Latin America for some time. It was translated into English, French, German, Portuguese, Dutch, Italian, Greek, Turkish, Swedish, Finnish, Danish, Japanese, and Korean  and sold some 700.000 copies overall; by 1993, it had been reprinted 32 times by the publisher Siglo Veintiuno Editores.

A hardcover edition with a new introduction by Dorfman was published by OR Books in the United States in October 2018.

 Reception 
Thomas Andrae, who has written about Carl Barks, has criticized the thesis of Dorfman and Mattelart. Andrae writes that it is not true that Disney controlled the work of every cartoonist, and that cartoonists had almost completely free hands unlike those who worked in animation. According to Andrae, Carl Barks did not even know that his cartoons were read outside the United States in the 1950s. Lastly, he writes that Barks' cartoons include social criticism and even anti-capitalist and anti-imperialist references.

David Kunzle, who translated the book into English, spoke to Carl Barks for his introduction and came to a similar conclusion. He believes Barks projected his own experience as an underpaid cartoonist onto Donald Duck, and views some of his stories as satires "in which the imperialist Duckburgers come off looking as foolish as—and far meaner than—the innocent Third World natives".

See also
 Seduction of the InnocentReferences

Sources
 
 
 

 
 
 
 

Further reading
 Robert Boyd. "Uncle $crooge, Imperialist" Comics Journal #138 (October 1990), pp. 52–55. 
 Dwight Decker. "If This Be Imperialism..." Amazing Heroes #163 (April 15, 1989), pp. 55-57. An installment of the "Doc's Bookshelf" column. Analysis by a prominent comic book fan and Carl Barks expert.
 Dana Gabbard and Geoffrey Blum. "The Color of Truth is Gray." Walt Disney's Uncle Scrooge Adventures in Color'' #24 (1997), pp. 23–26. Critical analysis by two experts on Carl Barks.
 How to Read Donald Trump: On Burning Books but Not Ideas  A 2017 essay by Dorfman.
Dan Piepenbring (June 3, 2019) The Book That Exposed the Cynical Politics of Donald Duck. The New Yorker.
Bryan, Peter Cullen. Creation, Translation, and Adaptation in Donald Duck Comics: The Dream of Three Lifetimes, Chapter 1: "A Duck's Eye View of Europe": How to Read Donald Duck. Springer International Publishing, 2021. Examines the scope of the foreign popularity of Donald Duck as compared to the smaller role taken in America.

1971 non-fiction books
Spanish-language books
Censored books
Books about comics
Books about Disney
Books about propaganda
Chilean books
Donald Duck
Book burnings
Books about capitalism